The Beaujon Enduro is a single-seat, American high-wing, pusher configuration ultralight aircraft. The Enduro was introduced in 1978 and remains available as plans from Beaujon Aircraft of Ardmore, Oklahoma.

Development

The Enduro is an early ultralight design that was first developed before the United States ultralight category and its FAR 103 Ultralight Vehicles rules were finalized, but it fits into the requirements including the category's maximum  empty weight.

Reviewer Andre Cliche says of Beaujon's designs that they are "beautifully simple".

Design
The Enduro's wing and tail structure include wooden aircraft-grade spruce spars with polystyrene foam ribs. The constant-chord, wooden-framed wing and the tail surfaces are covered with  poplar plywood. The wing is strut-braced.

The tricycle landing gear features a fixed tail skid just behind the cockpit, steel-sprung main-gear suspension and a nose skid. Like many pusher ultralight aircraft the Enduro sits on its tail skid when unoccupied and on its nose skid when a pilot is sitting in the seat. No brakes are specified in the design.

The controls are three-axis, with an overhead-mounted control column. The rudder and ailerons are designed to be interconnected and controlled via the control wheel.

The open frame fuselage consists of 6061T6 aluminum tubing and a single open pilot's seat. The powerplant is installed behind the pilot and above the  fuel tank.

Beaujon Aircraft supplies plans for the Enduro as part of a package which includes plans for eight ultralight craft as well as a 31-page manual.

Specifications (Enduro)

See also

References

External links

Official website
Photo of a modified Enduro

Single-engined pusher aircraft
1970s United States ultralight aircraft
Aircraft first flown in 1978